Rahamim Nissim Isaac Palacci (also "Palaggi," "Palagi," "Falaji," and many variations) (1813–1907) was a rabbi and author in Izmir, Turkey, and descendant of the Pallache family.

Life

Palacci was born in Izmir, the son of grand rabbi Haim Palachi and middle brother between grand rabbi Abraham Palacci and rabbi Joseph Palacci.

He learned Torah throughout his life and wrote many books.

He served as community rabbi (ran ha-kolel) and on Izmir's rabbinical court.

He became interim grand rabbi upon the death of his older brother in 1899.

Personal and death

Palacci married Rachel, daughter of rabbi Saadia Mikado Halevi, author of Neve Tzedek.

He died in 1907.

Legacy

Youngest brother, rabbi Joseph Palacci, was to succeed him but proved too young (under seventy-five) under current law.  Instead, Solomon, one of Abraham's sons, was nominated to succeed.  Due to Solomon's credentials (weak in scholarship, discordant in community), tension arose, and Joseph Eli (died 1906) was nominated.  To end the dispute, Solomon received another position in the rabbinate and Joseph Eli succeeded briefly (1899-1900).  Finally, Joseph ben Samuel Bensenior (1837–1913) succeeded as grand rabbi in December 1900.

Both Haim and Abraham mention him in many of their books; his books often interpret their words.

Works

 Avoth haRosh Volume 1 (Salonica, 1862)
 Avoth haRosh Volume 2 (Salonica, 1869)
 Avoth haRosh Volume 3 (Salonica, 1878)
 Yafeh laLev Volume 1 (Izmir, 1872)
 Yafeh laLev Volume 2 (Izmir, 1876)
 Yafeh laLev Volume 3 (Izmir, 1880)
 Yafeh laLev Volume 4 (Izmir, 1882)
 Yafeh laLev Volume 5 (Izmir, 1884)
 Yafeh laLev Volume 7 (Izmir, 1896)
 Yafeh laLev Volume 8 (Izmir, 1896)
 Yafeh laLev Volume 8 (Izmir, 1906)
 Yafeh laLev Volume 9 (Izmir, 1906)
 Beautiful Soul (Izmir)
 Beautiful Eye (Izmir)

See also
 Pallache family
 Pallache (surname)
 Haim Palachi
 Abraham Palacci
 Joseph Palacci
 Juda Lion Palache
 Charles Palache
 Samuel Pallache
 Joseph Pallache
 Joseph Pallache
 Moses Pallache
 David Pallache
 Isaac Pallache
 Samuel ha-Levi

References

Sephardi rabbis
Exponents of Jewish law
Turkish Jews
People from İzmir
Smyrniote Jews
1813 births
1907 deaths
19th-century rabbis from the Ottoman Empire
20th-century rabbis from the Ottoman Empire
Authors of books on Jewish law